Split-ticket voting is when a voter in an election votes for candidates from different political parties when multiple offices are being decided by a single election, as opposed to straight-ticket voting, where a voter chooses candidates from the same political party for every office up for election. Split-ticket voting can occur in certain mixed-member systems which allow for it, such as mixed-member proportional and parallel voting systems.

Example

Australia
In Australia, federal elections in recent times have usually involved a House of Representatives election and a half-Senate election occurring on the same day. The states, with the exception of Queensland and Tasmania, also hold elections for both houses of parliament simultaneously. An example of split-ticket voting in Australia is a voter who gives their first preference to the Liberal Party on the House of Representatives ballot paper and to the One Nation party in the Senate.

In the 2013 election, the Senate vote for both the Liberal and Labor parties was considerably lower than their lower house vote, demonstrating that a large number of people voted for a major party in the House of Representatives and a minor party or micro-party in the Senate. There are many reasons why a voter may do this, including the fact that many parties only stand candidates for the Senate (leaving their supporters unable to vote for them on their lower house ballot), the much lower quota required for election to the Senate compared to the House of Representatives (14.3% versus 50%), and a desire to check the power of the government by preventing it from controlling the Senate.

From 1978 to 2008, when the Australian Democrats held representation in the Senate, the Democrats benefited greatly from split-ticket voting, as their Senate vote was always much higher than their House of Representatives vote. The party built its campaigns around "keeping the bastards honest", a reference to holding the balance of power in the Senate so as to prevent the chamber from becoming either a rubber stamp for the government or a tool of obstruction for the opposition.

United Kingdom
In the United Kingdom the Additional Member System is used for the devolved assemblies of Scotland and Wales, as well as the London Assembly and is considered to increase the likelihood to split-ticket. As each voter casts two votes: one vote for a candidate standing in their constituency (with or without an affiliated party), and one vote for a party list standing in a wider region. In the constituency vote a single representative is elected using the traditional First-Past-The-Post system. The regional vote is used to elect multiple representatives from party lists to stand in regional seats, taking into account how many seats were gained by that party in the constituency vote, using a system of proportional representation: the number of seats a party receives will roughly reflect its percentage of the vote. Between the 1997 and 2003 elections in London, Scotland, and Wales between 17 and 28 percent of voters split their tickets.

United States
In the United States, multiple elections for many different offices are often held on the same day. This may be true of primary elections and may also include the placing of candidates for federal, state, and local offices on the same ballot. One of many possible examples of split-ticket voting in the United States is a voter who seeks to elect the Democratic Party's candidate for the Senate, the Republican Party's candidate for House of Representatives, the Green Party's candidate for County Supervisor, and the Libertarian Party's candidate for Coroner.

One example is the 2004 Montana gubernatorial election, where Democratic gubernatorial candidate Brian Schweitzer was elected governor 50.4% to 46.0%, while incumbent Republican President George W. Bush defeated Democrat John Kerry 59% to 39%. This suggests that a large number of the electorate voted for a split-ticket, selecting a Republican presidential candidate and a Democratic Party gubernatorial candidate. Another example is the 2016 West Virginia gubernatorial election, where Democrat (now Republican) Jim Justice won by eight points while Republican presidential candidate Donald Trump won in the state with 68% of the vote. Jim Justice later switched as a Republican in 2017. Another example is the 2020 United States Senate election in Maine where incumbent Susan Collins won by a 8.6% margin against Democratic challenger Sara Gideon, despite Joe Biden defeating Donald Trump in Maine by a 9.1% margin.

However, Democratic candidates seeking governorships in red states such as the Blue Dogs often hold somewhat more conservative views compared to those of a typical registered Democrat, whereas Republicans running for governor in blue states most notably the Rockefeller faction often have more liberal views compared to those of an average Republican supporter elsewhere.

For example, Massachusetts, despite being one of the most solidly Democratic states in national elections, elected Republican governors in 1990, 1994, 1998, 2002, 2014, and 2018. In 2018, Republican Governor Charlie Baker was reelected in a landslide, winning about two-thirds of the vote and sweeping every county. Meanwhile, at the exact same time, Democratic Senator Elizabeth Warren won reelection by over 20 points, and all nine Representatives of Massachusetts (all Democrats) won their reelections.

Recent history
Split-ticket voting saw a drastic decline in recent elections. In the 2020 presidential election, only 16 "crossover districts" — congressional districts that elected a presidential candidate and a House candidate of a different party — were recorded, in comparison to 35 in 2016 and 83 in 2008. The 2020 numbers represent only four percent of the overall congressional districts in the U.S., and a record low. In addition, the 2020 United States Senate elections left six states with a split representation between Democrats and Republicans, in comparison to 21 states with a split representation after 1992. This was attributed to the increasing polarization and nationalization of politics in the U.S., in which members of both political parties have regarded one another with antipathy.

Later, in the 2022 United States elections, there was a resurgence in split-ticket voting in a number of states. In some cases, concurrent gubernatorial and Senate races went to candidates of different parties. For example, in Georgia, Republican Brian Kemp defeated Democrat Stacey Abrams in the gubernatorial election by seven points, drastically outperforming Republican Herschel Walker in the concurrent Senate race, which Walker lost to Democrat Raphael Warnock after a runoff election in December. In other cases, there was a performance gap between gubernatorial and Senate candidates in the same state. For example, in Ohio, Governor Mike DeWine won the gubernatorial election by about 26 percentage points, while J. D. Vance won the concurrent Senate race by less than seven percentage points. The results of the 2022 elections were attributed by experts to the quality of candidates. The number of "crossover districts" also slightly increased from 16 to 23.

Motivations
Although less common, split-ticket voting can potentially be used as a form of tactical voting.  One possible example of this is a voter who prefers candidate A but does not believe that candidate A can win the election, so the voter votes for candidate B (who may be of a different political party from candidate A) because candidate B is better than other more competitive candidates C, D, etc.

Split-ticket voting may also occur in elections where multiple voting systems are employed. One possible example of this is a voter who, in a parallel voting system selects a candidate from a minority party for seats allocated by a proportional representation election system and selects a candidate from a larger party for a seat decided by a first past the post system. In mixed-member proportional systems large-scale strategic split ticket voting and the use of decoy lists may be used to subvert the compensatory effect of the system.

Split ticket preferences
Split ticket voting is different from split ticket preferencing, often referred to as a "split ticket".  In the latter, the candidate for political office (or the party they are standing for) will issue 'How to vote' cards or pamphlets which provide two different suggested alternatives on how voters who wish to vote for them should direct their second, third and subsequent preferences.

See also 

 Skirt and Blouse voting

References

Voting